Aargau Cantonal Bank is a cantonal bank based in Switzerland. Its head office is situated at Aarau, Switzerland. Founded in 1913, Aargau Cantonal Bank in 2021 had 832 employees and 32 offices in Switzerland, total assets were 31 777.48 mln CHF.

History 
Founded in 1855 as Aargauische Bank, the company changed its name in 1913 to Aargauische Kantonalbank. Subsequently, the bank acquired Freiämter Bank SLO (1994) and Sparkasse Mättenwil (1999). In 1999, the bank also opened a subsidiary in Olten in the canton of Solothurn which, after the cessation of activity of the cantonal bank of Solothurn (Solothurnische Kantonalbank) following a financial meltdown, no longer had a cantonal bank.

See also

Cantonal bank
List of banks
List of banks in Switzerland

References

Cantonal banks
Aargau